Sound maps are digital geographical maps that put emphasis on the sonic representation of a specific location. Sound maps are created by associating landmarks (streets in a city, train stations, stores, pathways, factories, oil pumps, etc.) and soundscapes.

The term “soundscape” refers to the sonic environment of a specific locale. It may also refer to actual environments, or to abstract constructions such as musical compositions and tape montages, particularly when considered as an artificial environment. The objective of sound maps is to represent a specific environment using its soundscape as primary references as opposed to visual cues. Sound maps are in many ways the most effective auditory archive of an environment. Sound maps are similar to sound walks which are a form of active participation in the soundscape. Soundwalks and indeed, sound maps encourage the participants to listen discriminatively, and moreover, to make critical judgments about the sounds heard and their contribution to the balance or imbalance of the sonic environment. However, soundwalks will plot out a route for the user to follow and give guidance as to what the user may be hearing at each checkpoint. Sound maps, on the other hand, have specific soundscapes recorded that users can listen to at each checkpoint.

History / Background 
The theoretical framework upon which sound maps are based derive from earlier research on acoustic ecology and soundscapes, the later being a term first coined by researcher and music composer R. Murray Schafer in the 1960s. Looking to challenge traditional ideas of recording reality, Schafer, along with several college music composers such as Barry Truax and Hildegard Westerkamp, funded the World Soundscape Project, an ambitious sound recording project that led the team based in Simon Fraser University to travel within Canada and out in Europe to collect data on local soundscapes. The sounds that they recorded were used to build a database of locales not based on the visual, but on their acoustic particularities. The result of the project had been released to the public in the form of a series books entitled The Music of the Environment series which included narrative accounts of the soundscape recording activity (European Sound Diary) and soundscape analysis (Five Village Soundscapes). However, when those works were first published, the recordings were not available for the public to listen to as the project mainly aimed at building a database of sound over a long period of time. The World Soundscape Project also birthed major theoretical framework for future studies of acoustic ecology and soundscapes, among them R. Murray Schafer’s The Tuning of the World in which the idea of soundscape studies were first introduced as well as Barry Truax’s The World Soundscape Project's Handbook for Acoustic Ecology that presented the foundational terminology for research in the field.

Sound maps make use of new computer locative technologies to achieve the similar purpose of preserving the soundscape of specific locales, but differs in the way of presenting the sound database. Through digital technologies such as mapping software and audio file encoding, the objective of using sound maps is partly that of making a soundscape database available to the public in a comprehensive fashion by uploading each site-specific soundscape onto a digital map as well as making the end product available for public collaboration. Users are able to pull up a map of the city and click on the sound clip icons in order to hear the soundscape for that location. Some sound maps are crowd-sourced and therefore allow the public to record their own soundscapes and upload them onto the digital map provided by the site hosting the sound map. Therefore, the soundscape database is built by the public and made available to the public for use.

Applications

The Sound Around You Project
The Sound Around You project began as a soundscape research project at the University of Salford, UK in 2007. The project allows people across the world to use their iPhone (or any other audio recorder) to record clips or sonic postcards of around 30 seconds in length from different sound environments, or ‘soundscapes’ from a family car journey to a busy shopping centre, and to upload them to the virtual map, along with their opinions of them and why they chose to record it. Sound Around You aims to raise awareness of how our soundscape influences us and could have far reaching implications for professions and social groups ranging from urban planners to house buyers.

New York Sound Map
The NYSoundmap is a project of The New York Society for Acoustic Ecology (NYSAE), a New York metropolitan chapter of the American Society for Acoustic Ecology, an organization dedicated to exploring the role of sound in natural habitats and human societies, and promoting public dialog concerning the identification, preservation, and restoration of natural and cultural sound environments.
The NYSAE's purpose is to explore and create an ongoing dialog regarding aural experience specific to New York City. The NYSoundmap project is the direct result of the NYSAE's interest in collecting and disseminating the city's aural experiences to the general public.
We are artists, architects, sound engineers, philosophers and designers. Our relationship to sound as a vital and key component of urban living is made manifest by our desire to create and share this map with and for friends, neighbors and fellow citizens of the city of New York. Through the NYSoundmap project, the NYSAE aims to facilitate a dialogue between people from a wide variety of communities and backgrounds - from beginners to professional sound artists and musicians.

Stanley Park Soundmap
The Stanley Park Soundmap is a web-based document of the sonic attributes of one of North America's largest urban parks located in Vancouver, British Columbia, Canada. Using a GPS unit, and a compact digital audio recorder 13 positions in the park were documented on a cool sunny day on Thursday, March 12, 2009. The location data and sound recordings were then linked to a map created in a Geographic Information Systems (GIS) based desktop application.

Montreal Sound map
The Montréal Sound Map is a web-based soundscape project that allows users to upload field recordings to a Google Map of Montréal. The soundscape is constantly changing, and this project acts as a sonic time capsule with the goal of preserving sounds before they disappear.

Sonoteca Bahia Blanca 
Sonoteca Bahia Blanca is a virtual platform that aims to provide a common space for the collection, concentration, sharing and distribution of sound through its georeferencing and organization in a database, from a collaborative, supportive cultural practice and community status. The project seek to enhance the sound heritage of the city, to rediscover and disseminate it, as a means of its multiple identities. Sound Map: www.sonotecabahiablanca.com/mapa

Sound map with the MOMA studio
Sound and space are closely linked. Our ears help define our surroundings by picking up on spatial clues in reflected sound waves. This innate ability to situate ourselves in our soundscape was probably more overtly useful in the days before electricity, when we had to rely on our ears to alert us to danger our eyes could not detect. There is, however, a movement in the visually impaired community to cultivate this ability to help them navigate in the world and participate in sports, and artists such as Janet Cardiff use sound and spatiality as integral parts of their work (see The Forty Part Motet).

Significance / Importance 
Sound maps give people a new way to look at geography and the world around them. They allow users to reconnect with their immediate environment which the current generation seldom does anymore (think about how often we see others with headphones in or on the phone instead of keeping their ears open). Sound maps also have a historical significance in that they will give future generations an idea of
what a specific place sounded like, at a specific time. Indeed, as the Montreal Sound Map project pointed out: sound maps can be used as “sonic time capsules” which preserve the sounds of a place before they disappear. Currently, we possess historical maps and pictures that can tell us how past societies lived. However, we have no idea what those societies sounded like. Sound maps give us an opportunity to have access to this vital historical significance.

See also 
Soundscape
Ambient music
Biomusic
Biophony
Field recording
Noise map
Sound art
Sound sculpture
Space music
Soundwalk
R. Murray Schafer

Further reading
 Schafer, Raymond Murray (ed.) (1977). European Sound Diary. Vancouver : A.R.C. Publications : A.R.C. the Aesthetic Research Centre ; Burnaby, B.C. : World Soundscape Project.
 Schafer, Raymond Murray (ed.) (2009). Five Villages Soundscape (2nd edition) Joensuu: Tampereen Ammattikorkeakoulu University of Applied Sciences (1st edition 1977).
 Smith, J. Susan (1994). "Soundscape". Area, Vol. 26, No.3, pp. 232–240. The Royal Geography Society.
 Waldock, Jacqueline (2011)."SOUNDMAPPING: Critiques And Reflections On This New Publicly Engaging Medium". Journal of Sonic Studies, volume 1, nr. 1.
 2006 The West Meets the East in Acoustic Ecology (Tadahiko Imada, Kozo Hiramatsu et al. Eds), Japanese Association for Sound Ecology & Hirosaki University International Music Centre

Sound file 
 Wind Portlandreginal(2011) by Scott Smallwood 
 Artcar(2011) by Scott Smallwood

References

External links 
Sound Mapping 1998
 New York Sound Map
 Sound Map of Budapest
 Sound Map of Bratislava
 Cerrado Ambisônico
 Sound Map of Krakow
 Sound Map of Wroclaw
 Belgrade Sound map
 Rabeca.org
 Basque country sound map
 Santorini Sound map
 Stanley Park Sound map
 Sonoteca Bahia Blanca Sound Map
 Montréal Sound map
 the MoMa Studio
radio aporee ::: maps global soundmap project

Experimental music
Sound
Acoustics